This is an alphabetical list of the slime mould taxa recorded from South Africa.

A
Genus: Aethalium Link 1809, accepted as Fuligo Haller, (1768) 
Aethalium septicum  (L.) Fr. 1829 accepted as Fuligo septica (L.) F.H. Wigg., (1780)

Family: Arcyriaceae Rostaf. ex Cooke 1877 accepted as Trichiales T.Macbr. (1922)

Genus: Arcyria 
Arcyria cinerae Pers.
Arcyria denudata Wettstein
Arcyria incamata Pers.
Arcyria insignis Kalchbr. & Cooke
Arcyria nutans Grev.
Arcyria oerstedtii Rost.
Arcyria pomiformis Rost.
Arcyria punicea Pers.
Arcyria serpula Mass.

B
Genus: Badhamia 
Badhamia affinis Rost.
Badhamia foliicola Lister.
Badhamia macrocarpa Rost.
Badhamia nitens Berk.
Badhamia rubiginosa var. dictyospora Lister
Badhamia utricularis Berk.
Badhamia varia Mass.
Badhamia sp.

C
Family: Ceratiomyxaceae see Ceratiomyxidae

Genus: Ceratiomyxa J. Schrot. (1889), (slime moulds)
Ceratiomyxa fruticulosa Macbr.
Ceratiomyxa fruticulosa var. flexuosa Lister
Ceratiomyxa fruticulosa var. porioides Lister

D
Genus: Dictydiaethalium 
Dictydiaethalium plumbeum Rost.

Genus: Dictydium 
Dictydium cancellatum Macbr.

Family: Didymiaceae 

Genus: Didymium 
Didymium difforme Duby.
Didymium leucopus Fr.
Didymium melanospermum Macbr.
Didymium microcarpon Rost.
Didymium nigripes Fr.
Didymium nigripes var. eximium Lister.
Didymium nigripes var. xanthopus Lister.
Didymium physaroides Fr.
Didymium squamulosum Fr.

E
Genus: Enerthenema Bowman 1830 
Enerthenema papillatum (Pers.) Rostaf. 1876

F
Genus: Fuligo Haller 1768 (Slime moulds)
Fuligo cinerea (Schwein.) Morgan 1896
Fuligo muscorum Alb. & Schwein. 1805
Fuligo septica Gmel.(sic) possibly (L.) F.H. Wigg. 1780
Fuligo varians Sommerf. 1826,

H
Genus: Hemitrichia 
Hemitrichia clavata Rost.
Hemitrichia serpula Rost.
Hemitrichia vesparium Macbr.

L
Genus: Lamproderma 
Lamproderma scintillans Morg.
Lamproderma violaceum Rost.

Genus: Leocarpus 
Leocarpus fragilis Rost.

M
Genus: Mucilago 
Mucilago spongiosa Morg.

Myxomycetes (Slime moulds)

P
Family: Physaraceae

Genus: Physarum
Physarum auriscalpium Cooke.
Physarum bitectum Lister.
Physarum bogoriense Rac.
Physarum capense Rost.
Physarum cinereum Pers.
Physarum citrinum Schum.
Physarum columbinum Sturgis.
Physarum compactum Lister
Physarum compressum Alb. & Schw.
Physarum confertum Macbr.
Physarum didermoides Rost.
Physarum digitatum Farquh. & G. Lister. 
Physarum flavicomum Berk.
Physarum gyrosum Rost.
Physarum javanicum Rac.
Physarum kalchbrenneri Mass.
Physarum leucophaeum Fr.
Physarum leucopus Link.
Physarum melleum Mass.
Physarum mutabile Lister.
Physarum nucleatum Rex.
Physarum nutans Pers.
Physarum nutans var. leucophaeum Lister. 
Physarum penetrale Rex.
Physarum pusillum Lister.
Physarum roseum Berk. & Br.
Physarum sinuosum Weinm.
Physarum tenerum Rex.
Physarum vemum Sommerf.
Physarum viride Pers.
Physarum viride var. aurantiaeum Lister.
Physarum viride var. incanum Lister.

R
Genus: Reticularia
Reticularia lycoperdon Bull.

Family: Reticulariaceae

S
Family: Stemonitaceae

Genus: Stemonitis 
Stemonitis acuminata Mass.
Stemonitis ferruginea Ehrenb.
Stemonitis friesiana de Bary.
Stemonitis fusca Roth.
Stemonitis herbatica Peck.
Stemonitis maxima Mass.
Stemonitis pallida Wingate.
Stemonitis splendens Rost.
Stemonitis splendens var. webberi Lister.

T
Genus: Trichia 
Trichia affinis de Bary
Trichia balfourii Mass.
Trichia botrytis Pers.
Trichia faboginea Pers.
Trichia fragilis Rost.
Trichia persimilis Karst.
Trichia scabra Rost.
Trichia turbinata Sow.
Trichia varia Pers.
 
Family: Trichiaceae

Genus: Tubifera (Slime moulds)
Tubifera ferruginosa Gmel.

References

Sources

  

Slime moulds